Yoshinori Ohno (大野 功統 Ōno Yoshinori, born October 16, 1935) was Japan's Minister of State for Defense in Prime Minister Junichiro Koizumi's third Cabinet from 2004 to 2005. He is a member of the Liberal Democratic Party.

Personal
Ohno was born in Taiwan (then under Japanese rule) in 1935 and return to Japan in 1947 and settled in Toyohama-cho, Mitoyo-gun, Kagawa Prefecture (now Kannonji City). He graduated from Takamatsu Daiichi Senior High School and then went on to study law at University of Tokyo in the Graduate School for Law and Politics. After university he began his career with the Ministry of Finance. After an unsuccessful bid as Governor of Kagawa Prefecture in 1978, Ohno was elected to the House of Representatives for Kagawa Prefecture in 1986 (and as member of the Kagawa Prefecture's 3rd District since 1996). From 2004 to 2005 he was Director General of the Japan Defense Agency.

External links 

  
 Yoshinori Ono's profile

1935 births
Living people
Members of the House of Representatives (Japan)
Japanese defense ministers
Liberal Democratic Party (Japan) politicians
21st-century Japanese politicians
University of Tokyo alumni
20th-century Japanese lawyers
20th-century Japanese politicians